The third edition of the Caribbean Series (Serie del Caribe) was played in 1951. The Series inauguration on February 21 was delayed due to heavy rain and it was held from February 22 through February 26, including two double-headers on February 25, featuring the champion baseball teams of Cuba, Leones del Habana; Panama, Spur Cola Colonites; Puerto Rico, Cangrejeros de Santurce, and Venezuela, Navegantes del Magallanes. The format consisted of 12 games, each team facing the other teams twice, and the games were played at Cervecería Caracas Stadium in Caracas, Venezuela.

Summary
The Puerto Rico team won the Series with a 5-1 record and was managed by George Scales. Their only defeat came from Cuba. The team was led by OF Luis Rodríguez Olmo, who was named Most Valuable Player after hitting .423 (11-for-26) with three home runs and nine RBI.  Other contributions came from pitchers Pantalones Santiago (two complete-game wins), Rubén Gómez (two wins, one save), 1B George Crowe (.333, one grand slam, 7 RBI), and SS Stan Breard (.423, seven runs, 4 doubles, 8 RBI). Also in the Puerto Rican roster were Jim Gilliam (2B), Buster Clarkson (3B), Bob Thurman (OF) and Willard Brown (OF).

Managed by Mike González, Cuba finished in second place with a 4-2 mark. 1B Lorenzo Cabrera led the Series hitters with an astronomical .619 batting average (13-for-23), while the pitching staff was led by Adrián Zabala (2-0), Hoyt Wilhelm (1-1) and Bill Ayers (1 win, 1 save). Also included in the roster were Sandy Amorós (OF), Pedro Formental (OF), Bert Haas (3B), Spider Jorgensen (2B), Ed Mierkowicz (OF), Jiquí Moreno (P) and Carlos Pascual (P).

Venezuela was managed by Lázaro Salazar and finished 2-4, with both victories over Panama. The team was led by 1B René González, who hit .316 (6-for-19), including two doubles, two home runs and a Series-leading 11 RBI. Pitcher José Bracho posted a 1-0 record and a 0.71 ERA in 12⅔ IP, helping himself with the bat while hitting .500 (3-for-6) with a double, one run and four RBIs. Other significant players in the roster included Luis García (3B), Vidal López (LF), Jim Pendleton (SS), Chucho Ramos (1B) and Ken Staples (C), as well as pitchers Frank Biscan, Julio Bracho, Alex Carrasquel and Clem Labine. 

Panama ended with a 1-5 mark and was managed by catcher León Kellman. The team's only victory came behind a strong pitching effort from starter Connie Johnson over the Cuban team, while 1B Archie Ware paced the offense in average (.348), hits (8) and RBI (4).

Participating teams

Final standings

Scoreboards

Game 1, February 22

Game 2, February 22

Game 3, February 23

Game 4, February 23

Game 5, February 24

Game 6, February 24

Game 7, February 25

Game 8, February 25

Game 9, February 25

Game 10, February 25

Game 11, February 26

Game 12, February 26

Statistics leaders

Awards

See also
Ballplayers who have played in the Series

References

Sources
Antero Núñez, José. Series del Caribe. Jefferson, Caracas, Venezuela: Impresos Urbina, C.A., 1987.
Gutiérrez, Daniel. Enciclopedia del Béisbol en Venezuela – 1895-2006 . Caracas, Venezuela: Impresión Arte, C.A., 2007.

External links
Official site
Latino Baseball
Series del Caribe, Las (Spanish)
  
  

Caribbean
Caribbean Series
International baseball competitions hosted by Venezuela
Sports competitions in Caracas
1951 in Venezuelan sport
1951 in Caribbean sport
Caribbean Series
20th century in Caracas